Catalina Peláez (born September 4, 1991 in Bogotá) is a professional squash player who represents Colombia. She reached a career-high world ranking of World No. 56 in October 2015.

References

External links 
 
 
 

1991 births
Living people
Colombian female squash players
Pan American Games medalists in squash
Pan American Games bronze medalists for Colombia
Squash players at the 2015 Pan American Games
South American Games gold medalists for Colombia
South American Games medalists in squash
Competitors at the 2010 South American Games
Competitors at the 2018 South American Games
Squash players at the 2019 Pan American Games
Competitors at the 2013 World Games
Competitors at the 2017 World Games
Medalists at the 2015 Pan American Games
Medalists at the 2019 Pan American Games
Medalists at the 2011 Pan American Games
Sportspeople from Bogotá
20th-century Colombian women
21st-century Colombian women